A raccoon is a medium-sized mammal native to North America, Europe, and Asia. The term may also be applied more widely to any member of the genus Procyon or family Procyonidae.

Raccoon  or racoon may also refer to:

 Racoon (band), a Dutch rock band
 Raccoon, Indiana
 Raccoon, Kentucky
 Raccoon, Pennsylvania
 , any of several ships of the British Royal Navy
 , any of several ships of the United States Navy
 The Raccoons, a Canadian animated television series of 1985-1992
 Raccoon City, a setting in the Resident Evil franchise
 Racoon (KAME), a key-exchange management daemon for Internet security
 Renault Racoon, a 4x4 concept vehicle
 Raccoon River, a tributary of the Des Moines River in Iowa in the United States

See also
 Raccoon Creek (disambiguation)
 Raccoon Township (disambiguation)
 Raccoon dog, a species of canid
 Japanese raccoon dog or tanuki, a subspecies of raccoon-dog often translated into English as "raccoon"
 List of fictional raccoons
"Rocky Raccoon", a song by The Beatles
Raccoon butterflyfish (Chaetodon lunula)